Schistura savona is a species of ray-finned fish in the genus Schistura.It is found along the eastern Himalaya in the Tista drainage at Darjeeling through Nepal, to Ghaghara and Kali drainages in Uttar Pradesh where it occurs in fast flowing hill streams with gravel beds. The specific name savona is a latinisation and contraction of the Bengali name for this species savon khorka.

References

S
Fish described in 1822